The Secession Synod was one of the founding constituent groups that formed the Presbyterian Church in Ireland in 1840. The other group being the Synod of Ulster.

Presbyterian Church in Ireland
Presbyterian synods